Dar Affes (arabic: دار العفاس) is one of the old houses of the medina of Sfax.

Location 
The house is located in the south western part of the medina, in Al Kasbah street, near the kasbah and the medressa Abbassiya.

History 

According to the commemorative plaque at the entrance of the monument, it was built during the 20th century, by Hadj Maohamed Affes (1892-1965). Unfortunately, and like many other monuments of the city, it got hugely damaged because of the second world war attacks. But it got rebuilt with the same architectural structure and design.

In 2016, and as part of the activities of "Sfax, arab Capital of Culture" celebration, Dar Affes got converted into a poetry house and a cultural space for local civic organisations.

Gallery

References 

Medina of Sfax